The Fujian Provincial Government was the former government that governed Fujian Province of the Republic of China. Since 2018, it has been superseded and its duties have been transferred to the Kinmen-Matsu Joint Services Center, the National Development Council and other ministries of the Executive Yuan.

History
After the end of Chinese Civil War in 1949, the Fujian provincial government was moved from Fuzhou to Kinmen. Then, the provincial government was relocated to Xindian Township, Taipei County within Taiwan Province in 1956. On 15 January 1996, the provincial government moved back to Kinmen County.

On 1 July 2018, by a resolution passed during the 3606th meeting of the Executive Yuan, all the remaining duties were transferred to the National Development Council and other ministries of the Executive Yuan. The transformation were scheduled to be done before the end of the year 2018. However, the government will keep the position of Governor of Fujian Province to comply with the requirement set by the Additional Articles of the Constitution.

Government structure 
The only official who served in the provincial government was the Governor of Fujian Province (also called the Chairperson of the Fujian Provincial Government). The Governor was usually also a minister without portfolio in Executive Yuan.

The provincial government was left with no physical building or office space after all of its functionalities were handed over to the central government in 2018. Historically, the provincial government was located in Jincheng, Kinmen from 1949 to 1956, in Xindian, Taipei County from 1956 to January 1996 and in Jincheng, Kinmen again from January 1996 to 2018.

Governor of Fujian Province 
The Governor of Fujian Province is the Chairperson of the Fujian Provincial Government.

Timeline

See also
 Taiwan Provincial Government
 Fujian Provincial People's Government, the People's Republic of China's parallel administration for its Fujian Province

References

External links 
 

1927 establishments in China
2019 disestablishments in Taiwan
Defunct organizations based in Taiwan
Government agencies disestablished in 2019
Government agencies established in 1927
Local governments of the Republic of China